Largo High School may refer to:
Largo High School (Florida), USA
Largo High School (Maryland), USA

See also
Lagro High School, Quezon City, Philippines